
Nowe Miasto County is a unit of territorial administration and local government (powiat) in Warmian-Masurian Voivodeship, northern Poland. It came into being on January 1, 1999, as a result of the Polish local government reforms passed in 1998.

As of 2006 its total population is 43,388, out of which the population of Nowe Miasto Lubawskie is 11,036 and the rural population is 32,352.

Neighbouring counties
Nowe Miasto County is bordered by Iława County to the north, Działdowo County to the east, Brodnica County to the south and Grudziądz County to the west.

Administrative division
The county is subdivided into five gminas (one urban and four rural). These are listed in the following table, in descending order of population.

References
Polish official population figures 2006

 
Nowe Miasto